Amirkela (also Romanized as Amīrkalā and AmīrKolā; also known as Amir Qal‘en) is a city in the Central District of Babol County, Mazandaran Province, Iran.  At the 2006 census, its population was 25,186, in 6,923 families.

Famous residents
Famous people from the town include the Safavid era poet Amir Pazevari and the
Ayatollahs Ali Asghar Mazandarani (1826–1911) and Mohammad Mehdi Emami Mazandarani (1879-1958).

Historic places
Two historic places are an old public bath (Hammam), built by Haj Molla Khalil Mazandarani of the Khalili Amiri family, early 19th century, and the Chehelsotoon complex, both in the old district of the city.

References

Populated places in Babol County

Cities in Mazandaran Province